Thirty Years of Arkham House, 1939–1969: A History and Bibliography is a bibliography of books published from 1939 to 1969 under the imprints of Arkham House, Mycroft & Moran and Stanton & Lee. It was released in 1970 by Arkham House in an edition of 2,137 copies.

References

1970 non-fiction books
Published bibliographies